The National College for Teaching and Leadership (NCTL) (inheritor of the site and functions of the National College for School Leadership (NCSL)) was an executive agency of the Department for Education (a United Kingdom Government Ministry whose responsibilities extended to England only, not Scotland, Wales or Northern Ireland). NCTL had two key aims, to improve academic standards by ensuring there was a well qualified and motivated teaching profession in sufficient numbers to meet the needs of the school system; and to support schools to help each other to improve.

NCTL also supported the quality and status of the teaching profession by ensuring that in cases of serious professional misconduct, teachers were prohibited from teaching, had oversight of teachers' induction and awarded Qualified Teacher and Early Years Teacher Status.

In April 2018 the National College for Teaching and Leadership was discontinued, its functions being absorbed by a new Teaching Regulation Agency for the regulation of the teaching profession, and by the Department for Education for other matters.

History 

The National College for Teaching and Leadership was formed on 29 March 2013, merging the activities of the National College for School Leadership and the Teaching Agency. NCSL had originally been established as a non-departmental public body, but become an executive agency of the Department for Education on 1 April 2012.

Established in 2000 as the National College for School Leadership, its physical centre – a learning and conference centre (LCC) situated in a striking building designed by Sir Michael Hopkins on the Jubilee Campus of the University of Nottingham – was opened on 24 October 2002 by Tony Blair. It cost £28m and was known  as the Sandhurst of teachers.

Key areas of work 
The NCTL 2015–16 annual report and accounts sets out their key areas of operational delivery as follows: 
 Providing over £210m funding in the form of bursary and salary contributions to initial teacher training providers to meet the teacher trainee recruitment targets;
 Delivering a range of projects to provide innovative solutions to the overall recruitment of teachers as well as subject specific recruitment in science, technology, engineering and mathematics (STEM);
 Designating and funding 576 Teaching Schools Alliances to develop school led initial teacher training activities, offering a range of continuing professional development (CPD) opportunities for teachers and leading on school-to-school support;
 Designating 1,134 national leaders of education to support schools in challenging circumstances;
 Working with licensees to deliver national professional qualifications to secure 9,895 participants into headship programmes;
 Managing over 1,000 referrals made during 2015–16 to consider allegations of serious misconduct against teachers, and holding case hearings to decide whether individuals should be prohibited from teaching in any school in England;
 Delivering national teacher recruitment media, television and digital campaigns to attract people into the teaching profession.

See also
 Training and Development Agency for Schools

References

External links 
 

Education in England
University of Nottingham
Executive agencies of the United Kingdom government
Organisations based in Nottinghamshire
Organizations established in 2000
Organizations disestablished in 2018
Buildings and structures in Nottingham
Teacher training colleges in the United Kingdom
Department for Education